Promenesta isotrocha is a moth in the family Depressariidae. It was described by Edward Meyrick in 1918. It is found in Argentina.

The wingspan is about 16 mm. The forewings are light yellow, with the second discal stigma small and grey. The hindwings are pale ochreous-yellowish.

References

Moths described in 1918
Promenesta
Taxa named by Edward Meyrick